Redbank Creek is a tributary of the Allegheny River in Clarion, Armstrong, and Jefferson counties, Pennsylvania in the United States.

Redbank Creek is born at the confluence of Sandy Lick Creek and the North Fork Creek in the borough of Brookville, then flows west to form the border between Clarion County on the north bank and Armstrong County on the south bank.  The tributary Little Sandy Creek joins just upstream of the community of Mayport.

The stream flows 50.3 miles (81 km) to join the Allegheny River and about 64 miles upstream from its confluence, just downstream of the borough of East Brady.

Political subdivisions
The political subdivisions Redbank Creek traverses, given in the order they are encountered traveling downstream, are as follows:

Brookville
Rose Township
Clover Township
Summerville
Clover Township
Beaver Township
Redbank Township (Armstrong)
Redbank Township (Clarion)
Hawthorn
Redbank Township (Clarion)
Mahoning Township
New Bethlehem
South Bethlehem
Mahoning Township
Porter Township
Madison Township (Clarion)
Madison Township (Armstrong)

Tributaries
The named tributaries of Redbank Creek, given in the order they are encountered traveling downstream, are as follows:

Sandy Lick Creek
North Fork Creek
Clement Run
Rattlesnake Run
Thompson Run
Simpson Run
Welch Run
Runaway Run
Carrier Run
Beaver Run
Tarkiln Run
Red Run
Patton Run
Little Sandy Creek
Miller Run
Pine Creek
Town Run
Middle Run
Leisure Run
Citizens Water Company Dam
Long Run
Leatherwood Creek
Middle Run
Rock Run
Wildcat Run

See also
 List of rivers of Pennsylvania
 List of tributaries of the Allegheny River
 Tributaries of Redbank Creek

References

External links
U.S. Geological Survey: PA stream gaging stations

Rivers of Pennsylvania
Tributaries of the Allegheny River
Rivers of Clarion County, Pennsylvania
Rivers of Armstrong County, Pennsylvania
Rivers of Jefferson County, Pennsylvania